The 1995 Ball State Cardinals football team was an American football team that represented Ball State University in the West Division of the Mid-American Conference (MAC) during the 1995 NCAA Division I-A football season. In its first season under head coach Bill Lynch, the team compiled a 7–4 record (6–2 against conference opponents) and finished in a tie for third place out of six teams in the MAC West. The team played its home games at Ball State Stadium in Muncie, Indiana.

The team's statistical leaders included Brent Baldwin with 1,192 passing yards, Michael Blair with 819 rushing yards, Ed Abernathy with 288 receiving yards, and Brent Lockliear with 52 points scored.

Schedule

References

Ball State
Ball State Cardinals football seasons
Ball State Cardinals football